Leuenbergeria aureiflora, formerly Pereskia aureiflora, is a species of cactus that is endemic to eastern Brazil. Its natural habitats are subtropical or tropical dry forests and hot deserts. It is threatened by habitat loss.

References

Cacti
Endemic flora of Brazil
Cacti of South America
Vulnerable flora of South America
Taxonomy articles created by Polbot
Plants described in 1979
Taxobox binomials not recognized by IUCN